The  was an award handed out annually between 2000 and 2006 by the Japanese publisher MediaWorks for exceptionally written short stories and novellas. The prize was associated with MediaWorks' now-defunct light novel magazine Dengeki hp. Between the first and fourth contests held, the editorial department of MediaWorks' included the narrowed-down novellas in an issue of Dengeki hp, and the winner was decided from a reader-participation voting poll. This was changed with the fifth though seven contests by the use of a committee to award the prize.

Committee members
Mamizu Arisawa: Novelist of the Inukami! series
Gakuto Coda: Novelist of the Missing series
Yukako Kabei: Novelist, and winner of the ninth Dengeki Novel Prize
Naoko Koyama: Editor-in-chief of Dengeki hp
Masami Okayu: Novelist of the Bludgeoning Angel Dokuro-Chan series

Prize winners

First prize (2000)
Grand prize
Post Girl, Jirō Masuko

Second prize (2001)
Grand prize
Under Rug Locking, Itsuki Nase

Honorable mention
Sakura in Pale Rose Bump, Takehiro Ariwara
Bludgeoning Angel Dokuro-Chan, Masami Okayu

Third prize (2002)
Grand prize
Shinjitsu no Kagami: Ofuda to Neko to Shōjo, Tenjō Hihiki

Honorable mention
Maisō Wakusei TheFuneralPlanet, Chiaki Yamashina

Fourth prize (2003)
Grand prize
Shiawase Nisei Taidōkyo Keikaku: Yōsei-san no Ohanashi, Yūsaku Igarashi

Honorable mention
Kare to Kanojo to Shōkan Mahō, Tsukasa Kōzuki
Saigo no Natsu ni Miageta Sora wa, Yu Sumimoto

Fifth prize (2004)
Grand prize
Inside World: Fuyu no Rocket, Tsukasa Suo

Gold prize
Unmei no Ito, Rakuda Mitsuki

Silver prize
Nisenyonhyakukyūkai no Kanojō, Yu Nishimura

Sixth prize (2005)
Grand prize
Unawarded

Gold prize
Mizumi no Kazoku, Shō Arisawa

Silver prize
Kaze no Sabaku, Kaze no Tō, Akito Mizawa
Choko to Hanabira, Yūei Miki

Seventh prize (2006)
Grand prize
Dramatic Ivory, Shōgo Ogawa
Reverse Kiss, Shinano Sano

2000 establishments in Japan
Awards established in 2000
Light novel awards
MediaWorks (publisher)
2006 disestablishments in Japan
Awards disestablished in 2006